Hasan Shahab (also Romanized as Ḩasan Shahāb; also known as Ḩasan Shoqā and Ḩasan Shaqāb) is a village in Tabadkan Rural District, in the Central District of Mashhad County, Razavi Khorasan Province, Iran. At the 2006 census, its population was 98, in 22 families.

References 

Populated places in Mashhad County